A Livingroom Hush is the second album of Jaga Jazzist, released in 2001 by Ninja Tune under the authority of the Warner Music Group. The BBC named it the best jazz album of 2002.
The album features ten instrumental songs, most of which having been composed by Lars Horntveth and Jørgen Munkeby.

Reception 
The Allmusic review awarded the album four stars and review by the Norwegian newspaper Dagbladet awarded the album 5 stars (dice).

Track listing

Credits 
Performed by Jaga Jazzist
Mathias Eick - trumpet, keyboards, double bass
Lars Horntveth - tenor & baritone saxophone, flute, bass-clarinet, acoustic, high-string guitar, keyboards
Lars Wabø - trombone
Line Horntveth - tuba
Andreas Mjøs - vibraphone, marimba, percussions, drums, keyboards
Jørgen Munkeby - flute, tenor saxophone, bass-clarinet, keyboards
Harald Frøland - guitar, effects, synthesizer
Morten Qvenild - keyboards
Ivar Chr. Johansen - keyboards
Even Ormestad - bass, keyboards
Martin Horntveth - drums, drum programming (drum-machines), percussion, keyboards
Jørgen Træen - electronics, keyboards, percussion, synthesizer (Ms-20 Ghost)

Production
Mastering – Audun Strype, Ingar Hunskaar
Mixing – Andreas Mjøs
Mixing, all string arrangements – Lars Horntveth
Mixing – Martin Horntveth
Artworks (sleeve - shape/color) – Martin Horntveth, christian@stateroom
Photography – Colin Eick
Producer, Recording, Mixing, – Jørgen Træen

Notes 
Recorded in Duper Studios, Spring 2000. Mixed Summer 2000. Mastered at Strype Audio.

References

External links 
 Jaga Jazzist Official Website

Jaga Jazzist albums
2001 debut albums
Smalltown Supersound albums